Billy Banks is the name of:
Billy Banks (rugby) (1925–1991), Welsh rugby league footballer
Billy Banks (singer) ( 1908–1967), American jazz singer

See also
Willie Banks (born 1956), American athlete
William Banks (disambiguation)